Ayatollah Seyed Hassan Ameli Kalkhoran (born 1962 in Ardabil) is an Iranian Shiite cleric, author and politician. He is a member of 4th and 5th Assembly of Experts from Ardabil Province electorate.

Ameli said about the 2016 Armenian–Azerbaijani clashes: We have wish presence in Karabakh war, Karabakh is the territory of Islam. I'd personally go to Nagorno-Karabakh War. his speech at Friday Prayers had many reflections in Azerbaijani media.

See also
Mir Ebrahim Seyyed Hatami

References

External links

 Hassan Ameli Website

People from Ardabil
Members of the Assembly of Experts
Living people
1962 births
University of Tehran alumni
Representatives of the Supreme Leader in the Provinces of Iran
Faculty of Theology and Islamic Studies of the University of Tehran alumni